The Republic of the Philippines and the United Nations have been affiliated since the conception of the organization. The then Commonwealth of the Philippines was one of the signatories of the 1942 UN Declaration, from which the U.N. Charter of 1945 was based on. The Philippines was also among the 51 original member states, and one of only four Asian nations, that signed this charter, which marked the beginning of the UN operations.
 
Since then, the Philippines has been active participants of the UN through various programs and commitments. Some of which include the Millennium Development Goals, the International Convention on the Protection of the Rights of All Migrant Workers and Members of their Families, the Convention against Illicit Traffic in Narcotic Drugs, among others. The Philippines consistently send peacekeepers to the U.N. The United Nations are also staffed by a large percentage of Filipinos. At the same time, the U.N. provides the Philippines with assistance in the event of calamities, and help the country raise funds for various causes.

Recently, the United Nations have been alarmed by the state of human rights in the country. During the 59th session of the International Covenant on Economic, Social and Cultural Rights last September 2016, held in Geneva, Switzerland, the Philippines was due for its periodic review. In this review, some issues that the U.N. committee brought up included the war on drugs of the administration, overcrowding in Philippine prisons, and forced eviction of informal settlers. Earlier this year, the U.N. also urged the Philippines not to reinstate the death penalty as it is in violation of the country's commitment under international law.

History 
The Philippines signed the Declaration by United Nations on June 10, 1942. The declaration agreed to the policies of the Atlantic Charter, a joint declaration between the United States and Great Britain that set out a vision for a post-war world. The text of the declaration affirmed the signatories' perspective "that complete victory over their enemies is essential to defend life, liberty, independence and religious freedom, and to preserve human rights and justice in their own lands as well as in other lands, and that they are now engaged in a common struggle against savage and brutal forces seeking to subjugate the world".

The document was the basis of the establishment of the United Nations in 1945.

The UN system in the Philippines began in 1945 when the Philippines, along with 49 other nations, signed the UN Charter in San Francisco, USA. The relationship between the Philippine government and UN is underscored by the contributions made by Carlos P. Romulo who acted as Philippine delegate to the United Nations Organization Conference and then became the Philippine ambassador to the United Nations from 1946 to 1954. Romulo eventually became the first Asian president during the 4th UN General Assembly.

Financial and other forms of assistance to the Philippines began in the late 1940s as the country recovered from the damages of World War II.  This partnership has grown since then into a number of development initiatives, activities and programmes.

The country is one of the co-founders of the G-77 coalition, which was founded in 1964 to promote collective economic interests among members of UN. Moreover, Filipinos had been president of the UN Security Council (UNSC) seven times: September and December 1957 under Carlos Romulo; September 1963 under Jacinto Castel Borja; July 1980 and September 1981 under Carlos Romulo; June 2004 under Lauro Baja Jr. and Delia Domingo-Albert; and September 2005 under Lauro Baja Jr. and Bayani Mercado. UNSC is in-charge of maintaining international peace and security.

In August 2013, Filipino peacekeepers were held under siege by Syrian rebels in Golan Heights. They successfully escaped their outpost after being trapped for five days while being were surrounded by Syrian rebels. Filipino troops were eventually pulled out from Syria.	

Being part of UN, Philippines files an arbitration case against China at the UN-backed Permanent Court of Arbitration (PCA) to settle the maritime dispute over West Philippine Sea in 2013. The country asked the arbitral tribunal to uphold the United Nations Convention on the Law of the Sea (UNCLOS), which grants exclusive rights to explore and develop maritime features 200 nautical miles from its baselines. On 12 July 2016, the tribunal ruled in favor of the Philippines. The tribunal also ruled that China has "no historical rights" based on the "nine-dash line" map.  However, China has rejected the ruling.

In July 2017, President Rodrigo Duterte hit the UN for allegedly interfering in the affairs of the Philippines. Duterte issued this statement after the executive director of the UN Office on Drugs and Crime (UNODC), Yury Fedotov, joined UN Secretary-General Ban Ki-moon in criticizing his administration's war against illegal drugs.

In the 59th session of the UN Committee on Economic, Social and Cultural Rights last year, Philippines was assessed in terms of its  compliance with the "International Covenant on Economic, Social and Cultural Rights." The committee probed the Philippine delegation on issues, such as the issue of extrajudicial killings, labor, and human trafficking.

United Nation-Philippine Relation

United Nation Entities Present in the Philippines 

The presence of the United Nations in the Philippines is found in the different globally-established subsidiaries, specialized agencies, and programmes the organization has enforced in the country. Each entity focuses on a particular social issue or addresses a specific need the UN aims to respond to. Currently, there are twenty-one bodies in the UN system present in the country.

Contributions to the Philippines 
In the 75 years that the Republic of the Philippines has been a member of the United Nations, the specialized agencies of this international organization has always provided support to its member nations.

Food Security

Organizations such as World Food Programme (WFP) and the Food and Agricultural Organization (FAO) have intervened in the country's issues with regard to hunger and food shortage. According to Social Weather Survey, approximately 3.4 million Filipino families experience involuntary hunger during the latter part of 2016. the Global Food Security Index ranked the Philippines 72nd of 109.

The WFP has provided nutritious meals for children aged 6–59 months, pregnant and nursing women, and livelihood programs for those affected by natural disasters and conflict.. The WFP, in partnership with the government agency FNRI or Food and Nutrition Research Institute have developed specially enhanced local produce and micronutrient powder for better health of Filipino children.
 
The FAO on the other hand focus on the Agricultural issues of the country. The FAO support areas in The Autonomous Region in Muslim Mindanao (ARMM) that are affected by conflict by rehabilitating local agriculture and fisheries-based livelihoods of more than 4 million farmers.

Climate Change and Risk Reduction

The UNDP or United Nations Development Programme, along with the Australian Government contributed 172 million pesos to the RAPID or Resilience and Preparedness towards Inclusiveness Development program for typhoon affected areas. This presence is established in about 12 Local Government Units in the Eastern Visayas Area.

Disaster Response and Recovery

In one of the country's most dire time of need, the UN along with its network for humanitarian organizations banded together in order to aid the country in the sectors of Health, Shelter, Nutrition, and Economic Activity.
According to the UN Office for Coordination of Humanitarian Affairs, the total funds donated reached about $469 million.

Health

The United Nations Children's Emergency Fund (UNICEF) has addressed the issue of Infant and Maternal Mortality in the Philippines by allocating a number of birth attendant and maternal facilities to the country. Due to this, the number of health facilities in more rural areas as well as birthing centers has increased, especially in more remote areas such as Sarangani and Eastern Samar. Aside from this, the same organization also assists the efforts of the Department of Health when it comes to preventing diseases with vaccines in especially high-risk areas in the Mindanao area and the Cordillera Regions.

Education

UNICEF also assists in the Government's program that promotes a universal kindergarten called The Early Childhood Care and Development Program. The program is deployed in vulnerable areas that are subject to poverty, conflict or natural disasters such as Mountain Province, Masbate, Eastern Samar, North Cotobato, Sarangani, Davao, Maguindanao, and Manila. Other than kindergartens, UNICEF also has a hand in establishing more child-friendly models and practices to be followed by more than 5.3 thousand primary schools and 61 high schools as well as contributions to education policies drafted by the Department of Education (DepEd).

Peace and Security

During the dispute between the Philippines and China for the West Philippine Sea (South China Sea), the arbitral tribunal, at the request of the country upheld the United Nations Convention on the Law of the Sea which dictates exclusive rights to utilize the seas within 200 nautical miles in whatever way they see fit.

Role of the Philippines in the United Nations 

Filipinos in the UN

 Carlos P. Romulo is remembered in Philippine history for his remarkable UN participation – as president of the 4th Session of the UN General Assembly. 
 Rommel Maranan, who worked as one of the youngest diplomats in the UN
 Natalyn Bornales, who was information officer at the UN's Dag Hammarskjöld Library
 Reynaldo Naval Jr, who helped establish public information centers at the UN peacekeeping mission in Kosovo in the wake of the 1999 war
 UN photographer Loey Felipe, whose photo on the UN Security Council observing a moment of silence in honor of the victims of the crashed flight MH17 circulated all over the news.

Coalition co-founder

The country is one of the co-founders of the G-77 coalition. The Group of 77 is the largest intergovernmental organization of developing countries in the United Nations, which provides the means for the countries of the South to articulate and promote their collective economic interests and enhance their joint negotiating capacity on all major international economic issues within the United Nations system, and promote South-South cooperation for development.

Peacekeepers

Instead of having its own standing army, the UN has a peacekeeping force (also known as "Blue Helmets" and "Blue Berets") composed of military and police personnel contributed by member states. As of 2014, the Philippines has contributed 37 police officers, 6 military experts, and 137 troops to the UN peacekeepers. The 6 military experts from the Philippines are part of the United Nations Military Observer Group in India and Pakistan, while the 37 police officers and 137 troops are part of the United Nations Stabilization Mission in Haiti. The Philippines is regarded as one of the most active countries in the Asia and Pacific region in terms of peace support troop contribution – the 4th among ASEAN members states, and 60th worldwide.

Golan Heights Incidents

On two separate incidents in March and May of 2013, Syrian rebels of the Yarmouk Martyrs Brigade abducted twenty-five Filipino peacekeepers on the ceasefire line between Syria and the Israeli-occupied Golan Heights after clashes in the area had put the peacekeepers in danger. They were under the United Nations Disengagement Observer Force (UNDOF)  which was established a year after the 1973 Mideast war. It monitors the disengagement of Israeli and Syrian forces and maintains a cease-fire. The rebels demanded they will keep the peacekeepers hostage until President Assad and his forces withdraw from the Syrian city of Jamlah.

Twenty-one peacekeepers were abducted on March 6 and were later released three days later. Another four peacekeepers were abducted in early May but were also released after a few days. In response to the abductions Foreign secretary Albert Del Rosario suggested to then President Benigno Aquino III for the Philippines to withdraw its 344 peacekeepers from the Golan Heights. The United Nations, together with the United States, appealed to the Philippines and warned of an adverse effect of withdrawing Filipino peacekeepers from the volatile region. During a meeting with UN officials in New York, Del Rosario stated three conditions to the United Nations for a continued stay of Filipino peacekeepers in the Golan Heights:

 The United Nations Disengagement Observer Force in the Golan Heights must deploy its full troop strength of 1,250 by October.
 Provide the equipment for the protection and defense of Filipino troops.
 The Philippines must be allowed to deploy troops using a six-month rotation.

In July 2013, Del Rosario said that he has dropped his recommendation to President Aquino for the withdrawal of Filipino peacekeepers and said that the UN officials promised to fulfill the three conditions laid by the government.

MANILA, Philippines — Under cover of darkness, 40 Filipino peacekeepers made a daring escape after being surrounded and under fire for seven hours by Syrian rebels in the Golan Heights, Philippine officials said Sunday, leaving 44 Fijian troops still in the hands of the al-Qaida-linked insurgents. "We may call it the greatest escape," Philippine military chief Gen. Gregorio Pio Catapang said.
On 20 September 2014, as a direct result of the deteriorating conditions in the Syrian Civil War, the Philippine Government has announced a complete withdrawal of 344 peacekeepers from the UNDOF.
Early on Aug. 28, al Qaeda-linked militants fighting government forces in Syria crossed a ceasefire line in the Golan Heights on Israel’s border and seized 45 Fijians serving in a United Nations peacekeeping force.

Fijian U.N. peacekeepers released by al-Qaeda-linked group Nusra Front in Syria on Thursday, gesture from inside a vehicle as they arrive in Israeli-held territory on the Golan heights September 11, 2014. REUTERS/Baz Ratner
The leader of a nearby U.N. contingent from the Philippines telephoned a commanding officer in Manila. They were surrounded, the leader said. Should they surrender and risk being kidnapped by the rebels or hold their ground?

The U.N. force commander, General Iqbal Singh Singha of India, fearing Fijian lives could be in jeopardy if the Filipinos engaged in a firefight, ordered the Filipinos to hold their fire. In Manila, General Gregorio Catapang gave different orders to his subordinate thousands of miles away in the Middle East: Stand your ground. Don’t surrender.

For three days, Filipino troops fended off hundreds of rebels from the Islamic militant Nusra Front group, killing at least three on the final day before escaping under cover of darkness to Israel. The Fijians were released on Thursday after two weeks of negotiation.

U.N. officials and diplomats say the incident with the Philippine peacekeepers highlights a fundamental problem with peacekeeping missions, one that may be impossible to resolve. National peacekeeping contingents retain allegiance to their commanders at home and when bullets fly, they have no problem disobeying U.N. force commanders and taking orders from home.

Based on interviews with U.N. officials, diplomats and Philippine military sources, including an official report on the incident from Manila, Reuters has pieced together a narrative of the events of Aug. 28 to Aug. 30 leading up to the dramatic escape of Philippine troops from the militants’ siege.
The peacekeepers received praise back home but was criticized by LTG Singha for a supposed "act of cowardice". However, on 9 October 2014, LTG Singha changed his tune as he briefed the UN Security Council on the situation of peacekeepers in the Golan Heights. He said that "the Filipino and Fijian peacekeepers bravely faced the situation, and exhibited raw courage, resilience and patience."

See also

 Permanent Representative of the Philippines to the United Nations

External links

References 

 
Foreign relations of the Philippines